The Missouri Office of Administration is the service and administrative control agency for the state of Missouri.  It was created in 1972 by a constitutional amendment to coordinate management functions  of the state government.  It is overseen by a commissioner appointed by the governor with the consent of the Senate.  The commissioner then appoints the deputy commissioner, chief counsel and the directors of the divisions within the office.

Divisions
There are seven divisions within the Office of Administration;
 Accounting - provides state government accounting and payroll services and publishes annual financial reports.
 Budget and Planning - provides budget instructions, reviews budget requests, and prepares the annual executive budget.
 Facilities Management, Design and Construction - provides asset management services to meet the facility needs of state agencies.
 General Services - provides essential support to state agencies.
 Information Technology Services - provides technology and communication services to state agencies.
 Personnel - provides human resources and leadership development informatio to state agencies.
 Purchasing - responsible for the procurement of all state-required supplies, materials, equipment and professional or general services.

References

External links
 Official Website
 Publications by or about the Missouri Office of Administration at Internet Archive.

Office of Administration
1972 establishments in Missouri
Government agencies established in 1972